The 2018 TCR Middle East Series season was the second season of the TCR Middle East Series. The championship started at Yas Marina Circuit in Abu Dhabi on 19 January and ended at Bahrain International Circuit in Sakhir on 24 February. Josh Files and Liqui Moly Team Engstler were the defending drivers' and teams' championships respectively.

Teams and drivers

Calendar and results 
The 2018 schedule was announced on 10 November 2017, with four events held across the Middle East. On 21 December 2017, was announced that will now be contested over three racing weekends instead of the four included in the previously released schedule.

Championship standings

Drivers' championship

Teams' Championship

Notes

References

External links 
 

TCR
Middle East Series
TCR